Theclinesthes miskini, the wattle blue, is a butterfly of the family Lycaenidae. It is found in Australia and New Guinea.

Description
The wingspan is about 20 mm. Adults have a pale blue upperside with chequered margins, but females also have a broad black band around the margins. They also have an arc of white scalloped markings on the hindwings. The underside of the wings is fawn with several white markings.

The larvae are dark green or brown with a dark dorsal band and pale diagonal streaks.

Ecology
The larvae generally feed on plants in the family Fabaceae including Paraserianthes lophantha, Sesbania cannabina, Acacia anceps, A. auriculiformis, A. flavescens, A. pycnantha, A. salicina, A. saligna, A. tetragonophylla, A. harpophylla, A. holosericea, A. neriifolia and A. victoriae, but also on Alectryon diversifolius, Atalaya variifolia, Hakea vittata and Eucalyptus polycarpa. Young seedlings are preferred to older foliage.

Larvae are occasionally attended by various black or green ants in the genera Iridomyrmex, Ochetellus, Calomyrmex, Camponotus, Notoncus, Paratrechina or Polyrhachis.

Subspecies
Theclinesthes miskini miskini (Australia: Cairns to Moruya, Northern Territory)
Theclinesthes miskini arnoldi (Fruhstorfer, 1916) (Cape York, Bismarck Archipelago)
Theclinesthes miskini eucalypti Sibatani & Grund, 1978 (Queensland)

References

Polyommatini